Belgern-Schildau is a town in the district Nordsachsen, in Saxony, Germany. It was formed on 1 January 2013 by the merger of the former towns Belgern and Schildau. It is located on the left bank of the Elbe, south of Torgau and east of Leipzig.

Personalities 

 Friedrich Anton von Heynitz (1725-1802), reformer of the Prussian mining system
 August Neidhardt von Gneisenau (1760-1831), Prussian Generalfeldmarschall and army reformer
 Friedrich Wilhelm Hauffe (1845-1915), politician (German Conservative Party), Member of Reichstag, Member of Landtag (Kingdom of Saxony)
 Adalbert Oehler (1860-1934), mayor of Düsseldorf (1911-1919)

References 

Nordsachsen
Populated riverside places in Germany
Populated places on the Elbe